In Confucianism, Chinese Buddhism, and Daoist ethics, filial piety (xiào) (Latin: pietas) is a virtue of respect for one's parents, elders, and ancestors. The Confucian Classic of Filial Piety, thought to be written around the late Warring States-Qin-Han period, has historically been the authoritative source on the Confucian tenet of filial piety. The book—a purported dialogue between Confucius and his student Zengzi—is about how to set up a good society using the principle of filial piety. Filial piety is central to Confucian role ethics.

In more general terms, filial piety means to be good to one's parents; to take care of one's parents; to engage in good conduct, not just towards parents but also outside the home so as to bring a good name to one's parents and ancestors; to show love, respect, and support; to display courtesy; to ensure male heirs; to uphold fraternity among brothers; to wisely advise one's parents, including dissuading them from moral unrighteousness; to display sorrow for their sickness and death; and to bury them and carry out sacrifices after their death.

Filial piety is considered a key virtue in Chinese and other East Asian cultures, and it is the main subject of many stories. One of the most famous collections of such stories is The Twenty-four Cases of Filial Piety. These stories depict how children exercised their filial piety customs in the past. While China has always had a diversity of religious beliefs, the custom of filial piety has been common to almost all of them; historian Hugh D.R. Baker calls respect for the family the one element common to almost all Chinese people.

Terminology 
The western term filial piety was originally derived from studies of Western societies, based on Mediterranean cultures. However, filial piety among the ancient Romans, for example, was largely different from the Chinese in its logic and enactment. Filial piety is illustrated by the Chinese character xiao. The character is a combination of the character lao (old) above the character zi (son), that is, an elder being carried by a son. This indicates that the older generation should be supported by the younger generation. 

In Korean Confucianism, the character  is pronounced hyo. In Vietnamese, the character  is written in the Vietnamese alphabet as hiếu.

In traditional texts

Definitions 
Confucian teachings about filial piety can be found in numerous texts, including the  Four Books, that is the Great Learning, the Doctrine of the Mean, Analects and the book Mencius, as well as the works Classic of Filial Piety and the Book of Rites. In the Classic of Filial Piety, Confucius (551–479 BCE) says that "filial piety is the root of virtue and the basis of philosophy" and modern philosopher Fung Yu-lan describes filial piety as "the ideological basis for traditional [Chinese] society".

For Confucius, filial piety is not merely a ritual outside respect to one's parents, but an inward attitude as well. Filial piety consists of several aspects. Filial piety is an awareness of repaying the burden borne by one's parents. As such, filial piety is done to reciprocate the care one's parents have given. However, it is also practiced because of an obligation towards one's ancestors.

According to some modern scholars, xiào is the root of rén (benevolence, humaneness), but other scholars state that rén, as well as yì (righteousness) and li (propriety) should be interpreted as the roots of xiào. Rén means favorable behavior to those whom we are close to. Yì refers to respect to those considered worthy of respect, such as parents and superiors. Li is defined as behaving according to social norms and cultural values. Moreover, it is defined in the texts as deference, which is respectful submission, and reverence, meaning deep respect and awe. Filial piety was taught by Confucius as part of a broad ideal of self-cultivation toward being a perfect human being.

Modern philosopher Hu Shih argued that filial piety gained its central role in Confucian ideology only among later Confucianists. He proposed that Confucius originally taught the quality of rén in general, and did not yet emphasize xiào that much. Only later Confucianists such as Tseng Tzu focused on xiào as the single most important Confucianist quality.

Detailed descriptions 

Confucian ethics does not regard filial piety as a choice, but rather as an unconditional obligation of the child. The relationship between parents and children is the most fundamental of the five cardinal relationships described by Confucius in his role ethics, and filial piety, together with fraternal love, underlies this system. It is the fundamental principle of Confucian morality: filial piety was seen as the basis for an orderly society, together with loyalty of the ministers toward the ruler, and servitude of the wife toward the husband. In short, filial piety is central to Confucian role ethics and is the cardinal virtue that defines, limits, or even eliminates all other virtues.

According to the traditional texts, filial piety consists of physical care, love, service, respect, and obedience. Children should attempt not to bring disgrace upon their parents. Confucian texts such as Book of Rites give details on how filial piety should be practiced. Respect is envisioned by detailed manners such as the way children salute their parents, speak to them (words and tone used) or enter and leave the room in which their parents are, as well as seating arrangements and gifts. Care means making sure parents are comfortable in every single way: this involves food, accommodation, clothes, hygiene, and basically to have them "see and hear pleasurable things" (in Confucius' words) and to have them live without worry. But the most important expressions of, and exercises in, filial piety were the burial and mourning rituals to be held in honor of one's parents.

Filial piety means to be good to one's parents; to take care of one's parents; to engage in good conduct not just towards parents but also outside the home so as to bring a good name to one's parents and ancestors; to perform the duties of one's job well (preferably the same job as one's parents to fulfill their aspirations) as well as to carry out sacrifices to the ancestors; to not be rebellious; to be polite and well-mannered; to show love, respect, and support; to be near home to serve one's parents; to display courtesy; to ensure male heirs and uphold fraternity among brothers; to wisely advise one's parents, including dissuading them from moral unrighteousness; to display sorrow for their sickness and death; and to bury them and carry out sacrifices after their death. Furthermore, a filial child should promote the public name of its family, and it should cherish the affection of its parents.

Traditional texts essentially describe filial piety in terms of a sonfather relationship, but in practice, it involves all parentchild relationships, as well as relationships with stepparents, grandparents and ancestors.

But filial piety also involves the role of the parent to the child. The father has a duty to provide for the son, to teach him in traditions of ancestor worship, to find a spouse for him, and to leave a good heritage. A father is supposed to be "stern and dignified" to his children, whereas a mother is supposed to be "gentle and compassionate". The parents' virtues are to be practiced, regardless of the child's piety, and vice versa. Nevertheless, filial piety mostly identified the 's duty, and in this, it differed from the Roman concept of patria potestas, which defined mostly the father's authoritative power. Whereas in Roman culture, and later in the Judeo-Christian West, people in authority legitimized their influence by referring to a higher transcending power, in Chinese culture, authority was defined by the roles of the subordinates (son, subject, wife) to their superior (father, emperor, husband) and vice versa. As roles and duties were depersonalized, supremacy became a matter of role and position, rather than person, as it was in the West.

Anthropologist Francis Hsu argued that a child's obedience from a Confucian perspective was regarded as unconditional, but anthropologist David K. Jordan and psychologist David Yau-fai Ho disagree. Jordan states that in classical Chinese thought, "remonstrance" was part of filial piety, meaning that a pious child needs to dissuade a parent from performing immoral actions. Ho points out in this regard that the Confucian classics do not advocate "foolish filial piety". However, Jordan does add that if the parent does not listen to the child's dissuasion, the child must still obey the parent, and Ho states that "rebellion or outright defiance" is never approved in Confucian ethics.

Filial piety not only extends to behavior of children toward their parents, but also involves gratitude toward the human body they received from their parents, as the body is seen as an extension of one's parents. This involves prohibitions on damaging or hurting the body, and this doctrine has affected how the Confucianists regarded the shaving of the head by Buddhist monks, but also has created a taboo on suicide, regarded as "unfilial behavior".

Relation with society at large 

Filial piety is regarded as a principle that ordered society, without which chaos would prevail. It is described as "an inevitable fact of nature", as opposed to mere convention, and it is seen to follow naturally out of the fatherson relationship. In the Chinese tradition of patriarchy, roles are upheld to maintain the harmony of the whole. According to the Neo-Confucian philosopher Cheng Hao (10321085 CE), relationships and their corresponding roles "belong to the eternal principle of the cosmos from which there is no escape between heaven and earth".

The idea of filial piety became popular in China because of the many functions it had and many roles it undertook, as the traditional Confucian scholars such as Mencius (4th century BCE) regarded the family as a fundamental unit that formed the root of the nation. Though the virtue of xiào was about respect by children toward their parents, it was meant to regulate how the young generation behaved toward elders in the extended family and in society in general. Furthermore, devotion to one's parents was often associated with one's devotion to the state, described as the "parallel conception of society" or the "Model of Two". The Classic of Filial Piety states that an obedient and filial son will grow up to become a loyal officialfilial piety was therefore seen as a truth that shaped the citizens of the state, and the loyalty of the minister to his emperor was regarded as the extension of filial piety. Filial piety was regarded as being a dutiful person in general.

Nevertheless, the two were not equated. Mencius teaches that ministers should overthrow an immoral tyrant, should he harm the statethe loyalty to the king was considered conditional, not as unconditional as in filial piety towards one parents.

In East Asian languages and cultures 
Confucian teachings about filial piety have left their mark on East Asian languages and culture. In Chinese, there is a saying that "among hundreds of behaviors, filial piety is the most important one".

In modern Chinese, filial piety is rendered with the words xiào shùn, meaning "respect and obedience". While China has always had a diversity of religious beliefs, filial piety has been common to almost all of them; historian Hugh D.R. Baker calls respect for the family the one element common to almost all Chinese people. Historian Ch'ü T'ung-tsu stated about the codification of patriarchy in Chinese law that "[i]t was all a question of filial piety". Filial piety also forms the basis for the veneration of the aged, for which the Chinese are known. However, filial piety among the Chinese has led them to be mostly focused on taking care of close kin, and be less interested in wider issues of more distant people: nevertheless, this should not be mistaken for individualism. In Japan, however, devotion to kinship relations was and still is much more broadly construed, involving more than just kin.

In Korean culture, filial piety is also of crucial importance. In Taiwan, filial piety is considered one of eight important virtues, among which filial piety is considered supreme. It is "central in all thinking about human behavior". Taiwan generally has more traditional values with regard to the parentchild relationship than the People's Republic of China (PRC). This is reflected in attitudes about how desirable it is for the elderly to live independently.

In behavioral sciences 

Social scientists have done much research about filial piety and related concepts. It is a highly influential factor in studies about Asian families and intergenerational studies, as well as studies on socialization patterns. Filial piety has been defined by several scholars as the recognition by children of the aid and care their parents have given them, and the respect returned by those children. Psychologist K.S. Yang has defined it as a "specific, complex syndrome or set of cognition, affects, intentions, and behaviors concerning being good or nice to one's parents". As of 2006, psychologists measured filial piety in inconsistent ways, which has prevented much progress from being made.

Filial piety is defined by behaviors such as daily maintenance, respect and sickness care offered to the elderly. Although in scholarly literature five forms of reverence have been described, multi-cultural researcher Kyu-taik Sung has added eight more to that, to fully cover the traditional definitions of elder respect in Confucian texts:

 Care respect: making sure parents are comfortable in every single way;
 Victual respect: taking the parents' preferences into account, e.g. favorite food;
 Gift respect: giving gifts or favors, e.g. presiding meetings;
 Presentational respect: polite and appropriate decorum;
 Linguistic respect: use of honorific language;
 Spatial respect: having elders sit at a place of honor, building graves at respectful places;
 Celebrative respect: celebrating birthdays or other events in honor of elders;
 Public respect: voluntary and public services for elders;
 Acquiescent respect: listening to elders without talking back;
 Consultative respect: consulting elders in personal and family matters;
 Salutatory respect: bowing or saluting elders;
 Precedential respect: allowing elders to have priority in distributing goods and services;
 Funeral respect: mourning and burying elders in a respectful way;
 Ancestor respect: commemorating ancestors and making sacrifices for them.

These forms of respect are based on qualitative research. Some of these forms involve some action or work, whereas other forms are more symbolic. Female elders tend to receive more care respect, whereas male elders tend to receive more symbolic respect.

Apart from attempting to define filial piety, psychologists have also attempted to explain its cognitive development. Psychologist R.M. Lee distinguishes a five-fold development, which he bases on Lawrence Kohlberg's theory of moral development. In the first stage, filial piety is comprehended as just the giving of material things, whereas in the second stage this develops into an understanding that emotional and spiritual support is more important. In the third stage, the child realizes that filial piety is crucial in establishing and keeping parentchild relationships; in the fourth stage, this is expanded to include relationships outside of one's family. In the final stage, filial piety is regarded as a means to realize one's ethical ideals.

Psychologists have found correlations between filial piety and lower socio-economic status, female gender, elders, minorities, and non-westernized cultures. Traditional filial piety beliefs have been connected with positive outcomes for the community and society, care for elder family members, positive family relationships and solidarity. On the other side, it has also been related to an orientation to the past, resistance to cognitive change, superstition and fatalism; dogmatism, authoritarianism, and conformism, as well as a belief in the superiority of one's culture; and lack of active, critical and creative learning attitudes. Ho connects the value of filial piety with authoritarian moralism and cognitive conservatism in Chinese patterns of socialization, basing himself on findings among subjects in Hong Kong and Taiwan. He defines authoritarian moralism as hierarchical authority ranking in family and institutions, as well as the pervasiveness of using moral precepts as criteria of measuring people. Cognitive moralism he derives from social psychologist Anthony Greenwald, and means a "disposition to preserve existing knowledge structures" and resistance to change. He concludes that filial piety appears to have a negative effect on psychological development, but at the same time, partly explains the high motivation of Chinese people to achieve academic results.

In family counselling research, filial piety has been seen to help establish bonding with parents. Ho argues that the value filial piety brings along an obligation to raise one's children in a moral way to prevent disgrace to the family. However, filial piety has also been found to perpetuate dysfunctional family patterns such as child abuse: there may be both positive and negative psychological effects. Francis Hsu made the argument that when taken to the level of the family at large, pro-family attitudes informed by filial piety can lead to nepotism, corruption and eventually are at tension with the good of the state as whole.

In Chinese parentchild relations, the aspect of authority goes hand-in-hand with the aspect of benevolence. E.g. many Chinese parents support their children's education fully and do not allow their children to work during their studies, allowing them to focus on their studies. Because of the combination of benevolence and authoritarianism in such relations, children feel obliged to respond to parents' expectations, and internalize them. Ho found, however, that in Chinese parentchild relations, fear was also a contributing factor in meeting parents' filial expectations: children may not internalize their parents' expectations, but rather perform  as good children in a detached way, through affectrole dissociation. Studying Korean family relations, scholar Dawnhee Yim argues that internalization of parents' obligations by children may lead to guilt, as well as suppression of hostile thoughts toward parents, leading to psychological problems. Jordan found that despite filial piety being asymmetrical in nature, Chinese interviewees felt that filial piety contained an element of reciprocity: "... it is easy to see the parent whom one serves today as the self who is served tomorrow." Furthermore, the practice of filial piety provides the pious child with a sense of adulthood and moral heroism.

History

Pre-Confucian history 

The origins of filial piety in East Asia lie in ancestor worship, and can already be found in the pre-Confucian period. Epigraphical findings such as oracle bones contain references to filial piety; texts such as the Classic of Changes (10th4th century BCE) may contain early references to the idea of parallel conception of the filial son and the loyal minister.

Early Confucianism 

In the T'ang dynasty (6th10th century), not performing filial piety was declared illegal, and even earlier, during the Han dynasty (2nd century BCE3rd century CE), this was already punished by beheading. Behavior regarded as unfilial such as mistreating or abandoning one's parents or grandparents, or refusing to complete the mourning period for them was punished by exile and beating, at best.

From the Han Dynasty onward, the practice of mourning rites came to be seen as the cornerstone of filial piety and was strictly practiced and enforced. This was a period of unrest, and the state promoted the practice of long-term mourning to reestablish their authority. Filial piety toward one's parents was expected to lead to loyalty to the ruler, expressed in the Han proverb "The Emperor rules all-under-heaven with filial piety". Government officials were expected to take leave for a mourning period of two years after their parents died. Local officials were expected to encourage filial piety to one's parentsand by extension, to the stateby behaving as an example of such piety. Indeed, the king himself would perform an exemplary role in expressing filial piety, through the ritual of "serving the elderly". Nearly all Han emperors had the word xiào in their temple name. The promotion of filial piety in this manner, as part of the idea of li, was more an acceptable way to create order in society than resorting to law.

Filial piety became a keystone of Han morality.

During the early Confucian period, the principles of filial piety were brought back by Japanese and Korean students to their respective homelands, where they became central to the education system. In Japan, rulers gave awards to people deemed to practice exemplary filial conduct.

During the Mongolian rule in the Yuan dynasty (13th14th century), the practice of filial piety was perceived to deteriorate. In the Ming dynasty (14th17th century), emperors and literati attempted to revive the customs of filial piety, though in that process, filial piety was reinterpreted, as rules and rituals were modified. Even on the grassroots level a revival was seen, as societies that provided vigilance against criminals started to promote Confucian values. A book that was composed by members of this movement was The Twenty-four Cases of Filial Piety.

Introduction of Buddhism 

Filial piety is an important aspect of Buddhist ethics since early Buddhism, and was essential in the apologetics and texts of Chinese Buddhism. In the Early Buddhist Texts such as the Nikāyas and Āgamas, filial piety is prescribed and practiced in three ways: to repay the gratitude toward one's parents; as a good karma or merit; and as a way to contribute to and sustain the social order. In Buddhist scriptures, narratives are given of the Buddha and his disciples practicing filial piety toward their parents, based on the qualities of gratitude and reciprocity. Initially, scholars of Buddhism like Kenneth Ch'en saw Buddhist teachings on filial piety as a distinct feature of Chinese Buddhism. Later scholarship, led by people such as John Strong and Gregory Schopen, has come to believe that filial piety was part of Buddhist doctrine since early times. Strong and Schopen have provided epigraphical and textual evidence to show that early Buddhist laypeople, monks and nuns often displayed strong devotion to their parents, concluding filial piety was already an important part of the devotional life of early Buddhists.

When Buddhism was introduced in China, it had no organized celibacy. Confucianism emphasized filial piety to parents and loyalty to the emperor, and Buddhist monastic life was seen to go against its tenets. In the 3rd–5th century, as criticism of Buddhism increased, Buddhist monastics and lay authors responded by writing about and translating Buddhist doctrines and narratives that supported filiality, comparing them to Confucianism and thereby defending Buddhism and its value in society. The Mouzi Lihuolun referred to Confucian and Daoist classics, as well as historical precedents to respond to critics of Buddhism. The Mouzi stated that while on the surface the Buddhist monk seems to reject and abandon his parents, he is actually aiding his parents as well as himself on the path towards enlightenment. Sun Chuo (300–380) further argued that monks were working to ensure the salvation of all people and making their family proud by doing so, and Liu Xie stated that Buddhists practiced filial piety by sharing merit with their departed relatives. Buddhist monks were also criticized for not expressing their respect to the Chinese emperor by prostrating and other devotion, which in Confucianism was associated with the virtue of filial piety. Huiyuan (334–416) responded that although monks did not express such piety, they did pay homage in heart and mind; moreover, their teaching of morality and virtue to the public helped support imperial rule.

From the 6th century onward, Chinese Buddhists began to realize they had to stress Buddhism's own particular ideas about filial piety in order for Buddhism to survive. Śyāma, Sujāti, and other Buddhist stories of self-sacrifice spread a belief that a filial child should even be willing to sacrifice its own body. The Ullambana Sūtra introduced the idea of transfer of merit through the story of Mulian Saves His Mother and led to the establishment of the Ghost Festival. By this Buddhists attempted to show that filial piety also meant taking care of one's parents in the next life, not just this life. Furthermore, authors in China and Tibet, and to some extent Japanwrote that in Buddhism, all living beings have once been one's parents, and that practicing compassion to all living beings as though they were one's parents is the more superior form of filial piety. Another aspect emphasized was the great suffering a mother goes through when giving birth and raising a child. Chinese Buddhists described how difficult it is to repay the goodness of one's mother, and how many sins mothers often committed in raising her children. The mother became the primary source of well-being and indebtedness for the son, which was in contrast with pre-Buddhist perspectives emphasizing the father. Nevertheless, although some critics of Buddhism did not have much impact during this time, this changed in the period leading up to the Neo-Confucianist revival, when Emperor Wu Zong (841–845) started the Great Anti-Buddhist Persecution, citing lack of filial piety as one of his reasons for attacking Buddhist institutions.

Filial piety is still an important value in a number of Asian Buddhist cultures. In China, Buddhism continued to uphold a role in state rituals and mourning rites for ancestors, up until late imperial times (13th–20th century). Also, sūtras and narratives about filial piety are still widely used. The Ghost Festival is still popular in many Asian countries, especially those countries which are influenced by both Buddhism and Confucianism.

Late imperial period 

During the 17th century, some missionaries tried to prevent Chinese people from worshiping their ancestors. This was regarded as an assault on Chinese culture.

During the Qing dynasty, however, filial piety was redefined by the emperor Kangxi (16541722), who felt it more important that his officials were loyal to him than that they were filial sons: civil servants were often not allowed to go on extended leave to perform mourning rituals for their parents. The parallel conception of society therefore disappeared from Chinese society.

Unlike western societies, patriarchalism and its enactment in law grew more strict in late imperial China. The duties of the obedient child were much more precisely and rigidly prescribed, to the extent that legal scholar Hsu Dau-lin argued about this period that it "engendered a highly authoritarian spirit which was entirely alien to Confucius himself". Indeed, the late imperial Chinese held patriarchalism high as an organizing principle of society, as laws and punishments gradually became more strict and severe.

But during the same time, in Japan, a classic work about filial practices was compiled, called Biographies of Japanese Filial Children.

19th20th century 
During the rise of progressivism and communism in China in the early 20th century, Confucian values and family-centered living were discouraged by the state and intellectuals. During the New Culture Movement of 1911, Chinese intellectuals and foreign missionaries attacked the principle of filial piety, the latter considering it an obstruction of progress.

In Japan, filial piety was not regarded as an obstacle to modernization, though scholars are in disagreement as to why this was the case. Francis Hsu believed that "the human networks through which it found concrete expressions" were different in Japan, and there never was a movement against filial piety as there was in China.

The late imperial trend of increased patriarchalism made it difficult for the Chinese to build strong patrimonial groups that went beyond kin. Though filial piety was practiced much in both countries, the Chinese way was more limited to close kin than in Japan. When industrialization increased, filial piety was therefore criticized more in China than in Japan, because China felt it limited the way the country could meet the challenges from the West. For this reason, China developed a more critical stance towards filial piety and other aspects of Confucianism than other East Asian countries, including not only Japan, but also Taiwan.

In the 1950s, Mao Zedong's socialist measures led to the dissolution of family businesses and more dependence on the state instead; Taiwan's socialism did not go that far in state control.

Ethnographic evidence from the 19th and early 20th century shows that Chinese people still very much cared for their elders, and very often lived with one or more married sons.

Developments in modern society 
In 21st-century Chinese societies, filial piety expectations and practice have decreased. One cause for this is the rise of the nuclear family without much coresidence with parents. Families are becoming smaller because of family planning and housing shortages. Other causes of decrease in practice are individualism, the loss of status of elderly, emigration of young people to cities and the independence of young people and women. To amplify this trend, the number of elderly people has increased quickly.

The relationship between husband and wife came to be more emphasized, and the extended family less and less. Kinship ties between the husband and wife's families have become more bilateral and equal. The way respect to elders is expressed is also changing. Communication with elders tends to become more reciprocal and less one-way, and kindness and courtesy is replacing obedience and subservience.

Care-giving 

In modern Chinese societies, elder care has changed much. Studies have shown that there is a discrepancy between the parents' filial expectations and the actual behaviors of their children. The discrepancy with regard to respect shown by the children makes elderly people especially unhappy. Industrialization and urbanization have affected the practice of filial piety, with care being given more in financial ways rather than personal. But as of 2009, care-giving of the young to elderly people had not undergone any revolutionary changes in Mainland China, and family obligations still remained strong, still "almost automatic". Respect to elders remains a central value for East Asian people.

Comparing data from the 1990s from Taiwan and the PRC, sociologist Martin Whyte concluded that the elderly in Taiwan often received less support from the government, but more assistance from their children, than in China, despite the former being an economically more modern nation.

Work ethos and business practices 
In mainland Chinese business culture, the culture of filial piety is decreasing in influence. As of 2003, western-style business practices and managerial style were promoted by the Chinese government to modernize the country. However, in Japan, employees usually regard their employer as a sort of father, to which they feel obliged to express filial devotion.

Relation with law 

In some societies with large Chinese communities, legislation has been introduced to establish or uphold filial piety. In the 2000s, Singapore introduced a law that makes it an offense to refuse to support one's elderly parents; Taiwan has taken similar punitive measures. Hong Kong, on the other hand, has attempted to influence its population by providing incentives for fulfilling their obligations. For example, certain tax allowances are given to citizens that are willing to live with their elderly parents.

Some scholars have argued that medieval China's reliance on governance by filial piety formed a society that was better able to prevent crime and other misconduct than societies that did so only through legal means.

East Asian immigrants 

Chinese who immigrate to the United States generally continue to send money to their parents out of filial piety.

See also 
Family as a model for the state
Honour thy father and thy mother

Notes

References

Bibliography

Further reading

External links

Xiàojing: The Classic of Filial Piety
The Filial Piety Sutra, Buddhist discourse about the kindness of parents and the difficulty in repaying it

 
Family
History of religion in China
Social sciences terminology
Religious Confucianism